The 1996 Algarve Cup was the third edition of the Algarve Cup, an invitational women's association football tournament. It took place between 11  and 17 March 1996 in Portugal with Norway winning the event for the second time in its history, defeating Sweden, 4-0 in the final-game.

Format
China, Iceland and Russia were all invited to appear in the Algarve Cup for the first time replacing Italy, the Netherlands and the United States. China became the first team to compete in the tournament representing the Asian Football Confederation.

The eight invited teams were split into two groups that played a round-robin tournament. On completion of this, the fourth placed teams in each group would play each other to determine seventh and eighth place, the third placed teams in each group would play each other to decide fifth and sixth place, the second placed teams in each group would play to determine third and fourth place and the winners of each group would compete for first and second place overall.

Points awarded in the group stage followed the standard formula of three points for a win, one point for a draw and zero points for a loss.

Group A

Group B

Seventh Place

Portugal finished bottom of their group for the third year in a row but defeated Finland 3–0 to finish seventh in the final overall standings.

Fifth Place

Russia and Iceland faced each other in the fifth place deciding match and with the score level after normal time and an added period of sudden death extra-time, contested the outcome with a penalty shootout. Russia won this 3–2.

Third Place

China reached the third place play-off in their first appearance at the Algarve Cup and defeated Denmark to take the bronze medal.

Final

An all Scandinavian final saw 1995 FIFA Women's World Cup winners Norway beat Sweden 4–0 and become champions for the second time in the competition's history.

Awards

References

External links
1996 Algarve Cup on RSSSF

1996
1996 in women's association football
1995–96 in Portuguese football
1996 in Norwegian women's football
1996 in Swedish women's football
1995 in Chinese football
1995 in Russian football
1995–96 in Danish football
1995 in Finnish football
1995 in Icelandic football
March 1996 sports events in Europe
1996 in Portuguese women's sport